This is a list of notable footballers who have played for Nottingham Forest. The aim is for this list to include all players that have played 100 or more senior matches for the club. Other players who have played an important role for the club can be included, but the reason why they have been included should be added in the 'Notes' column.

For a list of all Nottingham Forest players, major or minor, with a Wikipedia article, see Category:Nottingham Forest F.C. players, and for the current squad see the main Nottingham Forest F.C. article.

Table
Players are listed according to the date of their first team debut. Appearances and goals are for first-team competitive matches only; wartime matches are excluded. Substitute appearances included.

The 'Intl.' column denotes players who earned a senior international cap whilst at Forest.

References 

 U-reds.com player database
 Nottingham Forest Official – All-time appearances spreadsheet and other Forest stats
 Times 50 Forest best 

Nottingham Forest F.C.
 
Nottingham Forest F.C.
Forrest
Association football player non-biographical articles